Tirumala Nayaka  ( Tamil: "Thirumalai Nayakar"; 1623–1659) was the ruler of Madurai Nayak Dynasty in the 17th century. He ruled Madurai between A.D 1623 and 1659. His contributions are found in the many splendid buildings and temples of Madurai. His kingdom was under constant threat from the armies of Bijapur Sultanate and the other neighbouring Muslim kingdoms, which he managed to repulse successfully. His territories comprised much of the old Pandya territories which included Coimbatore, Tirunelveli, Madurai districts, Aragalur in southern Tamil Nadu and some territories of the Travancore kingdom.

Tirumala Nayaka was a great patron of art and architecture and the Dravidian architecture evolved into the Madurai style. He rebuilt and renovated a number of old temples of the Pandya period. His palace, known as the Tirumala Nayaka Palace, is a notable architectural masterpiece.

Tirumala Nayaka's Madurai 

Tirumala Nayaka’s capital was Madurai. The royal residence had been moved from there to Thiruchirapalli by his predecessor, but Tirumala Nayaka moved it back to Madurai again. The reason for this move is claimed to be due to a dream Tirumala Nayaka had but also stated by historians that Madurai has a long history and continuously civilized through ages and thiruchirapalli is at a threat of immediate attack by Mysore.

Personal life

Ardent devotee 
Tirumala Nayaka ate his breakfast only after the pujas were performed at Srivilliputhur Aandal Temple To get the information that the pujas were completed, the king built mandaps about every five kilometres on the route from Madurai to Srivilliputhur and installed loud bells in them. Each mandap also had a small kitchen. When there was a message to be sent a series of bells rang.

References

External links 

 

 
 

Telugu people
Telugu monarchs
Madurai Nayak dynasty
1659 deaths
Year of birth unknown